This is a list of Italian football transfers featuring at least one Serie A or Serie B club which were completed from 5 January 2015 to 2 February 2015, date in which the winter transfer window would close. Free agent could join any club at any time.

Transfers
Legend
Those clubs in Italic indicate that the player already left the team on loan this season or new signing that immediately left the club

Footnotes

References
general
 
 

specific

Winter transfers
2014–15
Italian